Aldus Manutius, the Younger (13 February 1547 — 28 October 1597) was the grandson of Aldus Manutius and son of Paulus Manutius. He was the last member of the Manuzio family to be active in the Aldine Press that his grandfather founded.

Life

At the age of eleven, a work was published under his name, Eleganze della lingua Latina e toscana. Manutius the Younger was appointed to manage the Venice press while his father, Paulus Manutius, was away in Rome. In 1572 he married Francesca Lucrezin of the Giunti Family of Florence. After his father's death in 1574, Manutius became the head of the printing establishment. In 1585 he accepted the chair of Rhetoric at Bologna, travelling to Pisa in 1587 and on to Rome in 1588.

In 1590 Manutius managed the Vatican Press. Angelo Rocca, who established the Angelica Library, one of the oldest libraries, was associated with him.

On 28 October 1597 he died in Rome at 50 years of age.

References

Notes
 Paulus Manutius
 Aldus Manutius
 Aldine Press

External links
 

1547 births
1597 deaths
Italian printers
Italian publishers (people)
16th-century Italian businesspeople
Harold B. Lee Library-related rare books articles